Jean-Maxime Eyama Ndongo (born 8 November 1992), is a footballer who plays as a midfielder for Racing Micomeseng in the Equatoguinean Premier League. Before, he played for Deportivo Mongomo. Born in Cameroon, he represents the Equatorial Guinea national team at international level.

International career
Ndongo was a member of the Equatorial Guinea national team. He was part of the squad at the 2012 Africa Cup of Nations.

Honours
Racing de Micomeseng
National League First Division: 2015

References

External links
 
 

1992 births
Living people
Footballers from Douala
Equatoguinean footballers
Cameroonian footballers
Association football midfielders
Equatorial Guinea international footballers
Naturalized citizens of Equatorial Guinea
Cameroonian emigrants to Equatorial Guinea
2012 Africa Cup of Nations players
Deportivo Mongomo players